The R610 road is a regional road in Ireland, located in County Cork and Cork City, beginning at a junction with the N28 and terminating on Parnell Place and Grand Parade in the city centre (N8 and N22 junctions respectively). The road connects Monkstown, Passage West and Glenbrook in County Cork with Rochestown, Douglas and Cork city centre in Cork City.

References

Regional roads in the Republic of Ireland
Roads in County Cork